Teodoro Cuñado (born 13 February, 1970) is a Spanish long-distance runner. He competed in the men's 10,000 metres at the 2000 Summer Olympics.

References

1970 births
Living people
Athletes (track and field) at the 2000 Summer Olympics
Spanish male long-distance runners
Olympic athletes of Spain
Place of birth missing (living people)